Tony Tremlett may refer to:
Tony Tremlett (bishop) (1914–1992), Bishop of Dover
Tony Tremlett (priest) (born 1937), Anglican priest and former Archdeacon